Monmouth Cemetery is a cemetery located at Osbaston Road, Monmouth, Wales. It was available for burials between 1852 and 2012.

History
Monmouth Cemetery was opened on 1 December 1851. The ground was consecrated on 23 June 1852 by the Bishop of Llandaff with the vicar of Monmouth, the Reverend E. F. Arney. The first burial took place on 25 June 1852. The first ashes to be interred, in February 1930, were those of Reverend Kean Mottram Pitt, who died aged 70 on the Isle of Wight, and were placed in his parents' grave.

The cemetery came into existence because Monmouth Council had decided to close St Mary's Churchyard in Monmouth for burials as decaying human remains were appearing above ground. This was caused by the raised height of the churchyard. Residents in neighbouring Whitecross Street suffered a high mortality rate as a result and unpleasant odours from the churchyard were also evident

Henry Somerset, 7th Duke of Beaufort sold the land to the council for use as the new cemetery. Monmouth Union Workhouse (opened 1870) and Haberdashers' Monmouth School for Girls (1897) are nearby. Because of its proximity to Monmouth workhouse an area of the cemetery, currently used for cremated remains, was designated for use of the paupers. The Paupers' Graves are mostly unmarked however in 1909 a hooded wooden cross was set in stone and unveiled. It is inscribed in Latin with Ave Crux Spes Unica meaning 'Hail, O Cross, Our Only Hope'. The site is now owned and maintained by Monmouthshire County Council.

There is a small former chapel of rest at the cemetery, designed by Rev. M. Wyatt and built by Charles Jackson in 1851. It was closed to the public about 1969, but restored in 2010 and, following a celebratory opening on 26 June 2010, is now used as a genealogy centre.

The cemetery is open all hours with open access and parking. Its hillside situation means that some of its paths are quite steep. In 2012 the cemetery closed for new burials due to lack of space.

Facilities
 Three water points, placed at intervals on the path network.
 Limited parking at the chapel, mid-way and at the top of the cemetery.

Notable interments
 William Wilson Allen VC - served at the Battle of Rorke's Drift; died 12 March 1890 of influenza
Mary Ellen Bagnall Oakeley - local artist and antiquarian
Dr. Alfred Edwin Monahan - third bishop of Monmouth; died 10 August 1945
The Commonwealth War Graves Commission maintain and register the war graves of eight British service personnel of World War I (seven of them soldiers of the Royal Monmouthshire Royal Engineers) and six from World War II.

Gallery

References

External links
Monmouth Cemetery Site Map Download
Friends of Monmouth Cemetery

Buildings and structures in Monmouth, Wales
Cemeteries in Wales
History of Monmouthshire
Tourist attractions in Monmouthshire